is a Japanese television drama series that began airing on April 1, 2018 until March 24, 2019. It is the second installment of the Girls × Heroine Series produced by Takara Tomy and OLM, Inc. with the assistance of Shogakukan and EXPG Studio, following the success of Idol × Warrior Miracle Tunes! The show is aimed at a female demographic between the ages of 2 to 6. The series stars Yuki Miyoshi, Momoka Sumitani, Misaki Tsuruya, Youka Ogawa, and Kurea Masuda. The plot is centered on the Magimajo Pures, a group of middle school girls who transform into Magical Heroines to protect people's dreams from the Nuisance World.

The show also launched a brief singing career for the main cast, who are holding music activities as the Japanese idol girl group Magical² to promote the show. Following the show's end in 2019, it was succeeded by Secret × Heroine Phantomirage!

Plot 
Momoka, an ordinary middle school student, is summoned by Mokonyan, a fairy from the Magical World, to join Magical Heroines Rin and Mitsuki and stop the Nuisance World. Together, as Magimajo Pures, they purelize the Akiramests back into Majoka Jewels with magic.

Characters

Magimajo Pures
The main characters are first-year middle school students who transform into group of magical girls, Magimajo Pures using a Majoka Porte and their own Majoka Jewels. Each girl is given a magic wand called a Majoka Lumina and using different Majoka Jewels would allow them to cast spells that they can use with Majoka Porte to defeat their enemies. As the series goes on, their Majoka Jewels upgraded into a Royal Jewels, allow them to transform into Royal Mode. Originally starting with Momoka, Rin and Mitsuki they are joined by a now-purified Shiori and later by Yuria.

Played by Yuki Miyoshi
She is a bright and energetic first-year middle school student who is full of dreams. Her Majoka Jewel allows her to purify people's hearts. Her catchphrase is "That's magical!" Her solo purelize move is "Heartful Lovely Party".

Played by Momoka Sumitani
Originally from the Magical World, she holds excellent grades and enjoys reading. Her Majoka Jewel allows her to freeze items and calm people down. Her catchphrase is "How mysterious!" Her solo purelize move is "Frozen Cool Splash".

Played by Misaki Tsuruya
Originally from the Magical World, her love of sports allows her to become talented in that area, and, as a result, she is sought after by many school clubs. Her Majoka Jewel allows her to make people feel energetic. Her catchphrase is "Happy flower circles!" Her solo purelize move is "Flower Blossom Carnival".

Played by Youka Ogawa
Shiori is mysterious Magical Heroine manipulated by Jamahiko. In her daily life, she is a stylish girl who enjoys fashion. Her Majoka Jewel allows her to fires their enemies with starlight beams. Her solo purelize move is "Stardust Cosmic".

Played by Kurea Masuda
She holds the spirit of the unicorn and uses powerful magic. She came to Earth to protect the other four girls. Her Majoka Jewel allows her to create protective barriers. She is shy, but has a healing personality. Her solo purelize move is "Rainbow Milky Fantasy".

Magical World 

Played by Mariko Shinoda
Tiara is the owner of Tiara, a jewelry shop. She is from the Magical World who acts as the guardian between both worlds, and uses a crystal ball to observe affairs from afar, aside from providing the magic to allow the Magimajo Pures to transform.

A pink, cat-like fairy from the Magical World who is partnered with Momoka, Rin, and Mitsuki. She is always drinking Majoka Milk and eating fish-shaped cookies. She ends her sentences with the word "nyan".

A cat-like fairy from the Magical World who is partnered with Shiori. When entering Jama World, she got separated from Shiori and was held captive.

Jama World 

Played by Kenichi Endō
The leader of Jama World who stole the Majoka Jewels from the Magical World, using the Jamajama-dan to take away people's dreams.

Played by Kanata Hosoda
Jama Baron's apparent son, Jamahiko takes charge of the Jamajama-dan after usurping his father. Yuria reveals that he was a human boy kidnapped and brainwashed by Gran Ma, disappearing after the Magi Majo Pures purelize him before he resurfaces during the Magimajo Pures' final battle with Jama the Great.

Played by Kumiko Mori
Gran Ma is Jama Baron's mother and Jamahiko's grandmother. She leads the Jamajama-dan into stealing the Majoka Jewels after Jamahiko disappears before eloping with Santa Claus.

Jamajama-dan
The  are three Deluxe Akiramests who turn others into Akiramests with the Akirame Stones.

Played by Louis Kurihara
A rabbit-themed man who wears black clothes and ties his hair back, later revealed to be formerly a failing comedian who gave up his dream.

Played by Akosuya Miki
The only woman on the team, bear-themed with an afro and red clothes.

Played by Osamu Fujiki
A gorilla-themed man with dreadlocks wearing a frog-like hat and white clothes, later revealed to formerly a sweets shop apprentice.

Recurring characters 

Played by Eriko Sato
Ririka is Momoka's mother and also used to be a Magical Heroine.

Played by Yūta Watanabe
Mr. Omachi is the teacher of Momoka, Rin, and Mitsuki's class at Yumenokaze Middle School.

Played by Kyōhei Shimokawa
Kaito is Momoka's classmate and is in the art club with Rin. His mother is Marin Odawara, the creator of Rin's favorite manga series, Super Spy Vanilla Dessert. His dream is to become a manga artist.

Played by Hinata Arakawa
Moe is Momoka's classmate and is part of the school newspaper's staff with her. Her dream is to become a ballerina.

Played by Kanon Matsuzawa
Nanami is Momoka's classmate and is in the tennis team with Mitsuki.

Played by Fūto Takahashi
Teruki is a third year student who Rin has feelings for. He is part of the soccer team and was also elected as student council president. His dream is to become a soccer player.

Production
Following Idol × Warrior Miracle Tunes!, Magimajo Pures! is the second installment of the Girls × Heroine series to have Takashi Miike as general director. The title was trademarked on November 21, 2017. The cast members were chosen from TV Drama Girls Audition in the summer of 2017. The series' name and cast members Yuki Miyoshi, Momoka Sumitani, and Misaki Tsuruya, were first announced on during the show's debut showcase on January 30, 2018. Youka Ogawa was later announced as a cast member in June 2018, while Kurea Masuda was revealed as the final cast member on August 25, 2018. The dances are choreographed by EXPG Studio. Prior to being cast, Momoka Sumitani, Youka Ogawa, and Kurea Masuda were part of EXPG Studio's female U-14 trainee group, Kizzy.

A toy line was produced by Takara Tomy, featuring magical items, accessories, and costumes from the show. The show was advertised with the catchphrase, 

During the show's run, Yuki Miyoshi, Momoka Sumitani, Misaki Tsuruya, Youka Ogawa, and Kurea Masuda performed as their characters at events and released music under the name Magical² (stylized as magical² and pronounced "magical magical"). The first opening theme song, "Ai ni Tsuite", was first performed at Miracle²'s final concert tour in March 2018. Along with performing songs featured in the show, Magical² also performed "Fure Fure", the theme song for Alvark Tokyo for their 2018-2019 basketball season.

Media

Episode list

Magical × Heroine Magimajo Pures! was broadcast weekly from April 1, 2018 on TV Tokyo at 9:00 AM and BS TV Tokyo at 10:00 AM. Episodes were also uploaded onto Takara Tomy's YouTube channel one week after its original broadcast date, with each new episode available worldwide for up to one week. Episodes were also screened with English subtitles under the name Magical × Heroine Magimajo Pures! at Chara Expo USA 2018.

Asaka Uchida, Suzuka Adachi, Yuzuha Oda, Rina Usukura, and Mio Nishiyama reprised their roles from Idol × Warrior Miracle Tunes! in episode 6. Sasuke Ohtsuru and Takumi also reprised their roles from Idol × Warrior Miracle Tunes! in episode 16.

Discography

Studio albums

Extended plays

Singles

Promotional singles

Manga
 is illustrated by Yuuki Harami and ran in Pucchigumi starting from the May 2018 issue.

Other media

Momoka's Magical Heroine outfit was made available in the game Kiratto Pri Chan for the characters Mirai, Emo and Rinka through a card exclusively released in Pucchigumi on December 27, 2018.

Notes

References

External links
 
 Official Magical² website

2018 Japanese television series debuts
2019 Japanese television series endings
Children's manga
Girls × Heroine! television series
Japanese children's television series
Japanese drama television series
Magical girl anime and manga
Magical girl television series
OLM, Inc.
Tokusatsu television series
TV Tokyo original programming